Eidola is an American rock band from Salt Lake City, Utah, formed in 2011. The band consists of lead vocalist, composer and multi-instrumentalist Andrew Wells,  guitarist Sergio Medina, bass guitarist James Johnson, guitarist and unclean vocalist Matthew Dommer, and drummer Matthew Hansen. They self-released their debut studio album, The Great Glass Elephant, in 2012. The group signed to Blue Swan Records in 2014 and released their second and third albums, Degeneraterra (2015) and To Speak, To Listen (2017). In December 2017, lead guitarist Brandon Bascom left the band and was replaced by Royal Coda guitarist Sergio Medina.

The band released the single "Counterfeit Shrines" in June 2021, their first new song in over four years, and released their fourth studio album, The Architect in September on Blue Swan Records and Rise Records.

Career

2011–12: Formation and The Great Glass Elephant

Eidola first formed as a four-piece ambient post-hardcore band from Salt Lake City, Utah in 2011, with lead vocalist and guitarist Andrew Michael Wells, screamer and guitarist Matthew Dommer, bass guitarist James Johnson, and drummer Matthew Hansen. The group became well known in the local hardcore punk scene in the Salt Lake City area, eventually garnering an online and local cult following. The band became known for their eclectic amalgamation of math rock, post-rock, metalcore, post-hardcore, and ambient music and their eccentric live concert performances.

The band recorded their debut full-length studio album with music engineer Randy Cordner, who produced, mixed and mastered the record. The band self-released their debut studio album, The Great Glass Elephant, on December 1, 2012.

2013–16: Degeneraterra

In late 2013, the band added guitarist Brandon Bascom to take on live guitar duties to allow Andrew to focus on vocals. Eidola toured briefly with American band I, Omega in the US from December 5 to December 12, 2014.

Eidola began writing and recording their second studio album with Dance Gavin Dance guitarist Will Swan and former Dance Gavin Dance guitarist Josh Benton, in 2014. The album was recorded and produced at Pus Cavern Recording Studios in Sacramento, California. Their second studio album, Degeneraterra, was released on May 5, 2015, and was the group's first release on Swan's independent record label Blue Swan Records.>

In support of Degeneraterra, the band embarked on a headlining tour from October 18 to November 8, 2015, with support from rock bands Makari and Que Sera. On May 31, 2016, the band announced that they were touring as support on Hail the Sun's tour, with additional support from Belle Noire, from July 18 to July 25, 2016.

2017–2019: To Speak, To Listen

Eidola toured as support on Dance Gavin Dance and CHON's co-headlining tour in North America, with Vasudeva, from February 24 to March 19, 2017. On March 28, 2017, it was announced that Eidola would tour in support of Hail the Sun's headlining U.S. tour with American rock bands Capsize and Limbs, taking place from May 21 to June 24, 2017.

On April 28, 2017, Eidola announced their third studio album, entitled To Speak, To Listen, with a scheduled release date of June 2, 2017, on Blue Swan Records. The band revealed that they had recorded with producer Dryw Owens. The album featured collaborations with American musician Joey Lancaster, former A Lot Like Birds bass guitarist Matthew Coate, and musician and saxophonist Nicholas Pope.

In support of To Speak, To Listen, the band headlined a North American tour with musical groups The Ongoing Concept and Save Us From The Archon, which took place from August 17 to September 19, 2017.

On December 15, 2017, Eidola announced their headlining To Speak, To Listen Tour, with support from rock band Capstan and singer Andrés, which took place from February 8 to March 3, 2018. On the same day, the group released an instrumental version of their third studio album, To Speak, To Listen.

2019–present: The Architect

On November 11, 2019, the band confirmed that their fourth studio album was completed and would be "ready in early 2020" with a tour announcement to follow in support of its release. In December 2019, it was confirmed that Eidola will be performing at the second annual SwanFest on April 25, 2020, in Sacramento, California. Due to the COVID-19 pandemic, SwanFest was postponed to April 2022 and the group withheld the announcement of their 2020 headlining tour. In April 2020, Andrew Wells confirmed the title of their upcoming fourth record would be The Architect but expressed uncertainty on the release date amidst the COVID-19 outbreak and its effect on the music industry.

On June 29, 2021, Eidola released the single "Counterfeit Shrines", their first new song in over four years, as the lead single from their fourth studio album The Architect, which was released on September 17, 2021. The band toured as support on Dance Gavin Dance's Afterburner Tour in September and October 2021.

Musical style

Eidola has been labeled post-hardcore, experimental rock, progressive rock, post-rock, metalcore, math rock, and progressive metal.

Discography

Studio albums
 The Great Glass Elephant (2012)
 Degeneraterra (Blue Swan Records, 2015)
 To Speak, To Listen (Blue Swan Records, 2017)
 The Architect (Blue Swan Records/Rise Records, 2021)

Other albums
 To Speak, To Listen (Instrumental) (2017)

Band members

Current band members
 Andrew Wells – lead vocals, guitar (2011–present)
 James Johnson – bass guitar (2011–present)
 Matthew Dommer –  guitar, unclean vocals (2011–present)
 Matthew Hansen – drums, percussion (2011–present)
 Sergio Medina – guitar (2018–present)

Former band members
 Brandon Bascom – guitar, live backing vocals (2013–2017)

References

Musical groups from Salt Lake City
Musical groups from Utah
Rock music groups from Utah
Indie rock musical groups from Utah
American post-hardcore musical groups
American progressive rock groups
2011 establishments in Utah